Honeydew is a sugar-rich sticky liquid, secreted by aphids and some scale insects as they feed on plant sap. When their mouthpart penetrates the phloem, the sugary, high-pressure liquid is forced out of the anus of the aphid. Honeydew is particularly common as a secretion in hemipteran insects and is often the basis for trophobiosis. Some caterpillars of Lycaenidae butterflies and some moths also produce honeydew. 

Honeydew producing insects, like cicadas, pierce phloem ducts to access the sugar rich sap. The sap continues to bleed after the insects have moved on, leaving a white sugar crust called manna. Ants may collect, or "milk", honeydew directly from aphids and other honeydew producers, which benefit from their presence due to their driving away predators such as lady beetles or parasitic wasps—see Crematogaster peringueyi. Animals and plants in a mutually symbiotic arrangement with ants are called Myrmecophiles.

In Madagascar, some gecko species in the genera Phelsuma and Lygodactylus are known to approach flatid plant-hoppers on tree-trunks from below and induce them to excrete honeydew by head nodding behaviour. The plant-hopper then raises its abdomen and excretes a drop of honeydew almost right onto the snout of the gecko.

Honeydew can cause sooty mold—a bane of gardeners—on many ornamental plants. It also contaminates vehicles parked beneath trees, and can then be difficult to remove from glass and bodywork.  Honeydew is also secreted by certain fungi, particularly ergot. Honeydew is collected by certain species of birds, mosquitoes, wasps, stingless bees and honey bees, which process it into a dark, strong honey (honeydew honey). This is highly prized in parts of Europe and Asia for its reputed medicinal value. Parachartergus fraternus, a eusocial wasp species, collects honeydew to feed to their growing larvae. Recent research has also documented the use of honeydew by over 40 species of wild, native, mostly solitary bees in California.

Religion and mythology
In Norse mythology, dew falls from the ash tree Yggdrasil to the earth, and according to the Prose Edda book Gylfaginning, "this is what people call honeydew and from it bees feed."

In Greek mythology, méli, or "honey", drips from the Manna–ash, (Fraxinus ornus), with which the Meliae, or "ash tree nymphs", nursed the infant god Zeus on the island of Crete, (as in the Hymn to Zeus by Callimachus).

Honey-dew is referenced in the last lines of Samuel Coleridge's poem Kubla Khan, perhaps because of its mythological connotations:

In the Hebrew Bible, while the Israelites are wandering through the desert after the Exodus, they are miraculously provided with a substance, manna, that is sometimes associated with honeydew. Exodus 16:31 provides a description: "it was like coriander seed, white, and the taste of it was like wafers made with honey."

Nectar producing trees

Dates
The Ommatissus lybicus is attracted to certain cultivars of the date palm tree. The honeydew producing insects preferred the Medjhool variety to the Deglet Noor in Israel, where they have been observed in the Arava Valley. Very dense insect populations may have some adverse effects. Different methods of controlling the insects, including natural and chemical, have been studied.

Eucalyptus
In eucalypt forests, production of both the honeydew nectar and manna tends to increase in spring and autumn. Eucalyptus can produce even more manna than honeydew nectar. The sugar glider possum eats both, licking the nectar from branches. Other species attracted to the nectar include the feathertail glider, brush-tailed phascogale, and brown antechinus. Most trees are not able to produce sap if the phloem duct becomes damaged by mechanical processes.

Oaks 
The acorn weevil (Curculio glandium) habitually bores into the young acorns of oak trees. This injury can cause the tree to release a sweet honeydew, thought to attract wasps that can parasitize the weevil within its acorns. Honey bees sometimes collect this substance, in addition to honeydew from aphids feeding in oak forests, and use it to produce oak honey, an unusual varietal sold by specialist beekeepers.

Tamarisk
Two scale insects in the Sinai, Trabutina mannipara and Najacoccus serpentinus feed on Tamarisk trees. They secrete a sugary nectar that turns white when it hardens, resembling certain whitish flakes described in the Hebrew scriptures.

See also 
Lerp (biology)
List of honeydew sources

References

External links

 

Body fluids
Insect products
Sternorrhyncha